Jamestown News is a weekly newspaper based in Jamestown, North Carolina covering Guilford County. Located at 5500 Adams Farm Lane, Suite 204, Greensboro, NC 27407. In the YES! Weekly offices. 336.316.1232.

References

Weekly newspapers published in North Carolina
Guilford County, North Carolina